Judith Rodin (born Judith Seitz, September 9, 1944) is a philanthropist with a long history in U.S. higher education. She was the president of the Rockefeller Foundation from 2005 until 2017. From 1994 to 2004, Rodin served as the 7th permanent president of the University of Pennsylvania, and the first permanent female president of an Ivy League university.

Early life and education
Rodin was born Jewish in Philadelphia, Pennsylvania. She was the younger of two daughters of Morris and Sally Seitz. She graduated with honors from the Philadelphia High School for Girls and won an undergraduate scholarship to the University of Pennsylvania. At Penn, Rodin majored in psychology and graduated from the university's College for Women with a B.A. in 1966.  She was the president of Penn's Women's Student Government and led the groundwork for the merger with the Men's Student Government that ultimately formed the Student Committee on Undergraduate Education (SCUE) in 1965 that led to the co-education of the College of Arts and Sciences.  She went on to earn a Ph.D. from Columbia University, which she received in 1970. Rodin also completed some postdoctoral research at the University of California at Irvine in 1971.

Academic career
After teaching briefly at New York University, Rodin became an associate professor at Yale University, where she was to become well known among students as a popular lecturer. She held various professorial and other positions at Yale from 1972 to 1994, including dean of the Graduate School of Arts and Sciences,  chair of the Department of Psychology, and provost.

In 1994, Rodin was appointed president of the University of Pennsylvania, becoming the first permanent female president of an Ivy League institution and the first graduate of the university to take on its highest leadership role.  Her immediate predecessor was Dr. Claire M. Fagin, who served in 1994 as Interim President. As president, Rodin guided the university through a period of unprecedented growth and development that transformed Penn's academic core and dramatically enhanced the quality of life on campus and in the surrounding community. She encouraged revitalization in University City and West Philadelphia through public safety; the establishment of Wharton School alliances for small businesses; the development of buildings and streetscapes that turned outward to the community; and the establishment of a university-led partnership school, the Sadie Tanner Mossell Alexander University of Pennsylvania Partnership School.

Under Rodin's leadership, Penn invigorated its resources, doubling its research funding and tripling both its annual fundraising and the size of its endowment. It also created Penn Medicine, the unified organization comprising the university's medical school and hospital; attracted record numbers of undergraduate applicants, creating Penn's most selective classes ever; and rose in the U.S. News & World Report rankings of top national research universities from 16th in 1994 to 4th in 2002.

The Rockefeller Foundation
Rodin became president of the Rockefeller Foundation in March, 2005. Following the devastation of Hurricane Sandy in 2012, Rodin was appointed by New York Governor Andrew Cuomo to co-chair NYS 2100, a commission charged with finding ways to improve the resilience and strength of the state's infrastructure in the face of natural disasters and other emergencies.

Other professional work
Rodin is on the Board of Directors of Trilogy Education Services, Citigroup and Comcast Corporation, where she served as the presiding director until 2006.  Rodin has also served on the boards of various corporations, including Aetna, Electronic Data Systems (EDS) and BlackRock. She continues to serve as a trustee of the Brookings Institution.

Personal life
Rodin is married to Paul R. Verkuil, a former president of the College of William and Mary, former dean of the Tulane University Law School and former CEO of the American Automobile Association. Verkuil is a professor at the Benjamin N. Cardozo School of Law, where he served previously as dean. Rodin was previously married two other times, to Bruce Rodin and to Nicholas Neijelow, with whom she has a son.

Awards and honors
Rodin was elected to the American Academy of Arts and Sciences in 1990. In 1994, Rodin received the Golden Plate Award of the American Academy of Achievement. She was elected to the American Philosophical Society in 1995.

In 2003, Rodin was named to the PoliticsPA list of "Pennsylvania's Most Politically Powerful Women". That same year, Rodin received the Philadelphia Award, given to "citizen[s] of the region who [have] done the most to advance the best and largest interest of the community."

Rodin was named one of Crain's 50 Most Powerful Women in New York list three years in a row.  Rodin has also been recognized as one of Forbes Magazine's List of The World's 100 Most Powerful Women, and the National Association of Corporate Directors' (NACD's) 2011 Directorship 100, in recognition of her work promoting the highest standards of corporate governance.

References

External links
 Biography from the Rockefeller Foundation
 Judith Rodin at SourceWatch
 Interview on Charlie Rose

21st-century American psychologists
American women psychologists
Jewish American philanthropists
Presidents of the Rockefeller Foundation
Directors of Citigroup
Yale University faculty
Chief Administrators of the University of Pennsylvania
American Airlines people
Philadelphia High School for Girls alumni
University of Pennsylvania alumni
Columbia University alumni
1944 births
Living people
Women heads of universities and colleges
Members of the American Philosophical Society
Members of the National Academy of Medicine
20th-century American psychologists